Dion Cuiper (born 29 November 1993), known professionally as Dion Cooper, is a Dutch singer-songwriter. He is set to represent the Netherlands in the Eurovision Song Contest 2023 alongside Mia Nicolai with the song "Burning Daylight".

Early life and education 
Cuiper was born on 29 November 1993 and grew up in Wassenaar, South Holland, a suburb of The Hague. His father, who used to be a drummer in a funk band, introduced him to the music of, among others, Toto, the Police, Earth, Wind & Fire, the Beatles and Jimi Hendrix. Cuiper developed an interest for music and began playing the guitar at the age of 15. He later started writing and singing his own songs.

After completing his secondary education, Cuiper began studying international business and management, but dropped out at the age of 21 to focus on his musical career. He has cited Shawn Mendes, John Mayer and Harry Styles as his musical inspirations.

Career

2015–2022: The Voice of Holland and Too Young Too Dumb 
In 2015, Cuiper took part in the sixth season of The Voice of Holland. He advanced to the Battles, joining the team of rapper Ali B. He was eliminated after losing the Battle to Brace.

In 2021, Cuiper released his debut extended play Too Young Too Dumb. Later that year, he was a support act for Duncan Laurence during his 2021 club tour. In 2022, he released the singles "Know" and "Blue Jeans", which were co-written with Laurence.

2023: Eurovision Song Contest 
On 1 November 2022, the Dutch broadcaster AVROTROS announced that Cuiper had been selected to represent the Netherlands in the Eurovision Song Contest 2023, alongside Mia Nicolai. Their entry "Burning Daylight" was released on 1 March 2023.

Discography

Extended plays 
 Too Young Too Dumb (2021)

Singles

References 

Living people
1993 births
21st-century Dutch male singers
Dutch male singer-songwriters
Eurovision Song Contest entrants for the Netherlands
Eurovision Song Contest entrants of 2023
The Voice (franchise) contestants